Bending the Landscape is the title of an award-winning series of LGBT-themed anthologies of short speculative fiction edited by Nicola Griffith and Stephen Pagel.  Three books were produced between 1997 and 2002, subtitled Science Fiction, Fantasy, and Horror. Each volume won LGBT or genre awards.

Themes
The editors asked contributors to "imagine a different landscape... some milieu that had not happened" and then address the theme of Alien or Other, with the Other being a lesbian or gay man. However the stories were not specifically aimed at a gay readership. Mark R. Kelly's review in locus magazine bemoaned the anthologies lack of thematic breadth.

Awards
The series received awards including a World Fantasy Award, two Lambda Literary Awards, and two Gaylactic Spectrum Awards. Some individual stories contained within were also recipients of awards and nominations.

Bending the Landscape: Fantasy

Published in 1997.

Awards
 Lambda Literary Award, Lesbian and Gay Science Fiction, Fantasy & Horror
 World Fantasy Award, Best Anthology

Contents
 Frost Painting – novelette by Carolyn Ives Gilman
 Gary, in the Shadows – shortstory by Mark Shepherd
 Prince of the Dark Green Sea – shortstory by Mark McLaughlin
 Water Snakes – shortstory by Holly Wade Matter
 Gestures Too Late on a Gravel Road – shortstory by Mark W. Tiedemann
 The Fall of the Kings (The World of Riverside) – novelette by Ellen Kushner and Delia Sherman
 Cloudmaker – shortstory by Charlee Jacob
 Magicked Tricks – novelette by K. L. Berac
 The Sound of Angels – shortstory by Lisa S. Silverthorne
 The King's Folly – shortstory by James A. Moore
 Beside the Well – shortstory by Leslie What
 The Home Town Boy – shortstory by B. J. Thrower
 Expression of Desire – shortstory by Dominick Cancilla
 There Are Things Which Are Hidden from the Eyes of the Everyday – shortstory by Simon Sheppard
 Full Moon and Empty Arms – shortstory by M. W. Keiper
 Mahu – novelette by Jeff Verona
 The Stars Are Tears – shortstory by Robin Wayne Bailey
 Desire – shortstory by Kim Antieau
 Young Lady Who Loved Caterpillars – shortstory by Jessica Amanda Salmonson
 In Memory of – shortstory by Don Bassingthwaite
 In Mysterious Ways – novelette by Tanya Huff
 In the House of the Man in the Moon – shortstory by Richard Bowes

Bending the Landscape: Science Fiction

Published in 1998.

Awards
 Lambda Literary Award, Lesbian and Gay Science Fiction, Fantasy & Horror
 Gaylactic Spectrum Award
 Stonewall Book Award: Literature (finalist)

Contents
 Sex, Guns, and Baptists – shortstory by Keith Hartman
 Half in Love With Easeful Rock and Roll – shortfiction by Rebecca Ore
 Powertool – shortfiction by Mark McLaughlin
 Time Gypsy – novelette by Ellen Klages
 Lonely Land – shortfiction by Denise Lopes Heald
 The Rendez-Vous – shortfiction by Nancy Johnston
 Silent Passion – shortfiction by Kathleen O'Malley
 Sun-Drenched – shortfiction by Stephen Baxter
 The Flying Triangle – [Near Space] – shortfiction by Allen Steele
 Brooks Too Broad For Leaping – shortstory by Charles Sheffield
 A Real Girl – shortfiction by Shariann Lewitt
 Dance at the Edge – novelette by L. Timmel Duchamp
 Love's Last Farewell – shortfiction by Richard A. Bamberg
 On Vacation – shortfiction by Ralph A. Sperry
 The City in Morning – shortstory by Carrie Richerson
 State of Nature – shortstory by Nancy Kress
 The Beautiful People – shortfiction by Wendy Rathbone
 Who Plays With Sin – shortfiction by Don Bassingthwaite
 Surfaces – shortfiction by Mark W. Tiedemann
 Stay Thy Flight – shortfiction by Élisabeth Vonarburg
 Free in Asveroth – shortstory by Jim Grimsley

Bending the Landscape: Horror

Published in 2001.

Awards
 Gaylactic Spectrum Award

Contents
 Coyote Love – shortstory by Kraig Blackwelder
 Explanations Are Clear – novelette by L. Timmel Duchamp
 What Are You Afraid Of? – shortstory by Simon Sheppard
 The Lost Homeland – novelette by Cynthia Ward
 The Man Who Picks the Chamomile – shortstory by Mark McLaughlin
 Love on a Stick – novelette by Carrie Richerson
 Triangle – shortstory by Ellen Klages
 Memorabilia – novelette by Holly Wade Matter
 Blood Requiem – shortstory by Gary Bowen
 In the Days Still Left – novelette by Brian A. Hopkins and James Van Pelt
 Broken Canes – shortstory by Alexi Smart
 Keep the Faith – shortstory by A. J. Potter
 The WereSlut of Avenue A – shortstory by Leslie What
 Kindred – novelette by Alexis Glynn Latner
 'Til Death – shortstory by Barbara Hambly
 If I Could See Lazarus Rising – novelette by Kathleen O'Malley
 The Waltz of the Epileptic Penguins – shortstory by Keith Hartman
 Passing – novelette by Mark W. Tiedemann

See also

 Homosexuality in speculative fiction
 List of LGBT-themed speculative fiction

References

External links
 In depth review in Science Fiction Studies
 Reviews of some individual science fiction stories

LGBT speculative fiction
Fantasy anthologies
Horror anthologies
Science fiction anthologies
1997 anthologies
1998 anthologies
2001 anthologies
Lambda Literary Award-winning works
1990s LGBT literature
2000s LGBT literature
LGBT anthologies